An Innocent Bridegroom is a 1913 silent short film directed by Phillips Smalley and starring Pearl White. It was released as a split-reel program along with A Night in the Town.  Both films survive in the Library of Congress collection.

Cast
Pearl White
Chester Barnett
Joseph Belmont

References

External links
 An Innocent Bridegroom at IMDb.com

1913 films
Universal Pictures short films
American black-and-white films
1913 short films
American silent short films
1910s American films